Frances Lowater (1871-1956) was a British-American physicist and astronomer.

Life and career 
Lowater studied in England for her undergraduate degrees, at University College, Nottingham, and Newnham College, Cambridge. She then moved to the United States, where she attended Bryn Mawr College and earned her Ph.D. in 1906. While studying for her Ph.D., she took a position as a physics demonstrator, and remained in that position until 1910. She spent a year at Westfield College and four years at Rockford College, then moved to Wellesley College, where she spent the rest of her career; with the exception of a year teaching at the Western College for Women - from 1910 to 1911.

Lowater's spectrographic research examined Mira, R Leonis, R Serpentis, and T Cephei and studied the absorption spectra of sulfur dioxide. Her research was conducted at the Yerkes Observatory. She was a fellow of both the Royal Astronomical Society and the London Physical Society, and helped write the third volume of the Physical Society's Report on Progress in Physics with Wilfrid Basil Mann; she was also elected a member of the Royal Institution. Lowater died in 1956.

See also 
 List of astronomers

References

External links
 

English physicists
20th-century British astronomers
20th-century American astronomers
Women astronomers
20th-century British women scientists
20th-century American physicists
English emigrants to the United States
Alumni of the University of Nottingham
Alumni of Newnham College, Cambridge
Bryn Mawr College alumni
Bryn Mawr College faculty
Wellesley College faculty
Fellows of the Royal Astronomical Society
1871 births
1956 deaths
20th-century American women scientists
American women academics